Panagiotis Kostarellos (born 1933) is a Greek boxer. He competed in the men's bantamweight event at the 1960 Summer Olympics.

References

External links
 

1933 births
Living people
Greek male boxers
Olympic boxers of Greece
Boxers at the 1960 Summer Olympics
People from Domokos
Bantamweight boxers
Sportspeople from Central Greece
20th-century Greek people